Orbus may refer to:
Orbus (novel), 2009, by Neal Asher
Orbus, a French radio network
Orbus-21S, the Intelsat 603 satellite's 1990/1992 upper-stage rockets